SS Bjoren is a wood-fuelled steamboat that travels the route between Bygland-Byglandsfjord, Bygland and Bygland-Ose on the lake Byglandsfjorden in the municipality of Bygland in the Setesdal valley. She runs on Sundays in July.

Using wood as fuel is a natural choice as there was, and still is, good local access to it.  Using wood to fuel the steam engine contributes to make Bjoren a unique part of Norway's cultural heritage and a floating technical museum.

History

The steamer Bjoren was built at Akers Mekaniske Verksted in 1866. She had a new boiler installed and new engine that produced . She is certified for up to a maximum of 55 passengers.

In the early years Bjoren was in regular use at a place called Kilefjorden, a part of the river Otra. In the 1920s, buses took most of the traffic in the valley and eventually, when a new road was built in the 1950s, the traffic reasons for the steamer was gone. The boat was put in storage, deterioration started and eventually she sank.

Bjorens next life
In the 1970s, a group of local enthusiasts decided to make an attempt to preserve the boat.  As the boat was counted as part of Norwegian history, the government saw its interests and they helped with the funding. The boat was restored at Drammen Shiprepairs A/S and in 1994 was once again ready to be used.

Today, Bjoren is owned by the Bygland municipality and run by the company Bjoren AS. In addition, the local group called Bjorens venner (Friends of Bjoren) put a lot of effort into preserving the technical values of the boat. Bjoren is still receiving government funding and, as the world's only existing wood-fuelled steamboat still in service, she is a unique attraction to both tourists and others.

References

Steamships of Norway
Ferries of Norway
Setesdal
Bygland
1866 ships
Ships built in Oslo
Living museums